This was the first edition of the event.

Roman Borvanov and Artem Sitak won the title defeating Sergio Galdós and Guido Pella in the final, 6–4, 7–6(7–3).

Seeds

Draw

Draw

References
 Main Draw

IS Open - Doubles
2013 Doubles